Bhid Ja is a 2015 Indian Punjabi film based on sport Field hockey in Punjab, India and 23% of the film is self-shot as it is a one-man crew Punjabi film and without a cameraman.

References

External links
 Bhid Ja Will Expose The Hockey System

2015 films
Punjabi-language Indian films
2010s Punjabi-language films